Addicott were a people who despoiled Roman Britain between 364 and 368.

Addicott may also refer to:
 19444 Addicott, minor planet

People with the surname
 James E. Addicott, American football coach and mathematics professor
 Jeffrey Addicott, American lawyer and university professor